The Porto Alegre Junior Championships (Portuguese: Campeonato Internacional Juvenil de Tênis de Porto Alegre), also known as the Copa Gerdau, is a prestigious junior tennis tournament played on outdoor red clay courts in Porto Alegre, Brazil. The tournament is held annually in late February or early March. It is one of five Grade A tournaments, the junior equivalent of ATP Masters or WTA Premier Mandatory events in terms of rankings points allocated.

History
The Copa Gerdau was founded in 1984, and has hosted international players since 1987. It has been a Grade A event since 2007. Before this event was promoted to Grade A, Brazil's Banana Bowl tournament had held that distinction since 1998. The original venue for the Grade A tournament was the International Championships of Venezuela, which was founded in 1978 and held in Caracas.

Singles champions

Doubles champions

References

External links
 
 List of champions

Junior tennis
Recurring sporting events established in 1978
Tennis tournaments in Brazil
Clay court tennis tournaments
1978 establishments in Brazil
Sports in Porto Alegre